Daniel Walsh may refer to:

 Daniel Walsh (rower) (born 1979), American rower
 Daniel Walsh (born 2002), Australian footballer with Perth Glory
 Daniel B. Walsh (1935–2018), New York politician
 Daniel F. Walsh (born 1937), American prelate of the Roman Catholic Church
 Dan Walsh (born 1960), American painter
 Dan Walsh (banjo player), British banjoist and guitarist